The Monroe City Hall in Monroe, Georgia was built in 1939.  It was listed on the National Register of Historic Places in 1983.

It was designed by architects Daniel & Beutell in Art Deco style, and was built by John K. Davis & Son.

References

National Register of Historic Places in Walton County, Georgia
Art Deco architecture in Georgia (U.S. state)
Government buildings completed in 1939